Events in the year 1577 in Norway.

Incumbents
Monarch: Frederick II

Events

9 July - Ludvig Munk was appointed Governor-General of Norway.

Arts and literature

Births

Deaths
20 September – Jon Guttormssøn, Lutheran superintendent.

See also

References